The 3rd Armored Division Artillery (DIVARTY) was the divisional artillery command for the 3rd Armored Division, last stationed at Hanau before its inactivation in 1991.

Constituted in 1941, the DIVARTY served with the division during World War II and was inactivated after the end of the war along with the division. It was reactivated with the division in 1948, and sent to West Germany with the division in 1956. The DIVARTY served there for rest of the Cold War, then deployed with the division during the Gulf War. After returning to Germany, it was inactivated there in September 1991.

World War II 
The 3rd Armored Division Artillery was first constituted on 13 January 1941 in the Regular Army as the Artillery Section of the division headquarters, and activated on 15 April with the division at Camp Beauregard. On 1 March 1942, it was redesignated as the Divisional Artillery Command. After the end of World War II, it was inactivated in Germany on 10 November 1945.

Cold War 

While inactive, the Divisional Artillery Command was consolidated with the division Service Company (excluding for the Military Police Platoon), and redesignated as the Division Artillery. The Division Artillery headquarters and headquarters battery (HHB) was reactivated with the division at Fort Knox on 30 July 1948. On 1 July 1955, it was redesignated the 3rd Armored Division Artillery.

Gulf War 
DIVARTY was awarded the Meritorious Unit Commendation for its actions in the war. After returning to Germany, DIVARTY was inactivated there on 16 September 1991.

Honors

Campaign streamers 
The HHB of the 3rd Armored Division Artillery is entitled to the following Campaign streamers:

Decorations 
The HHB of the 3rd Armored Division Artillery is entitled to the following decorations:
 Meritorious Unit Commendation (Army), Streamer embroidered SOUTHWEST ASIA
 Belgian Fourragere 1940
 Cited in the Order of the Day of the Belgian Army for action in the Ardennes
 Cited in the Order of the Day of the Belgian Army for action in Belgium

References

Citations

Bibliography 
 
United States Army Division Artilleries
Military units and formations established in 1941
Military units and formations disestablished in 1991
1941 establishments in the United States